Trans Service Airlift (TSA) was an airline based at N'djili Airport, Kinshasa, Democratic Republic of the Congo. It was privately owned and operated in years 1991–1998.

Accidents and incidents
On December 18, 1995 a Lockheed L-188C Electra owned by Trans Service Airlift crashed shortly after takeoff from Jamba, Cuando Cubango, Angola, killing 141 of the passengers and crew. See Trans Service Airlift Lockheed L-188 crash.

Fleet 
According to information on August 2010 the Trans Service Airlift fleet included:

2 B727 (Ex-FedEx 2007/2010)
2 BAe 748 Series 2(Both aircraft broken up 1996/97)
1 Lockheed L-188 Electra (Aircraft sold and parked Kinshasa since Dec 1996 until present day)
1 Nord 262 (Aircraft crashed on takeoff N'dolo 1995 killing all pax - crew survived)
1 Vickers Viscount 700 (Aircraft broken up 1996)

See also		
 Transport in the Democratic Republic of the Congo

References

External links 
Aviation Safety Network

 
Defunct airlines of the Democratic Republic of the Congo
1991 establishments in Zaire
Airlines established in 1991
Airlines disestablished in 1998